Marian Hłuszkewycz (1877–1935) was a Russian poet.

External links
 

1877 births
1935 deaths
People from Lviv Oblast
People from the Kingdom of Galicia and Lodomeria
Soviet poets
Burials at Lychakiv Cemetery